Swift Creek is a river in the Hudson Bay drainage basin in Northern Manitoba, Canada. It runs from an unnamed lake to the Nelson River, which it enters as a left tributary. The river flows under the Hudson Bay Railway (passed by the Via Rail Winnipeg – Churchill train), between the settlements of Charlebois to the north and Amery to the south, just past its source; and under Manitoba Provincial Road 290 just before its mouth.

See also
List of rivers of Manitoba

References

Rivers of Northern Manitoba
Tributaries of Hudson Bay